In calculus, the extreme value theorem states that if a real-valued function  is continuous on the closed interval , then  must attain a maximum and a minimum, each at least once.

The extreme value theorem is more specific than the related  boundedness theorem, which states merely that a continuous function  on the closed interval  is bounded on that interval; that is, there exist real numbers  and  such that:

  

The extreme value theorem is used to prove Rolle's theorem.  In a formulation due to Karl Weierstrass, this theorem states that a continuous function from a non-empty compact space to a subset of the real numbers attains a maximum and a minimum.

History
The extreme value theorem was originally proven by Bernard Bolzano in the 1830s in a work Function Theory but the work remained unpublished until 1930.  Bolzano's proof consisted of showing that a continuous function on a closed interval was bounded, and then showing that the function attained a maximum and a minimum value.  Both proofs involved what is known today as the Bolzano–Weierstrass theorem. The result was also discovered later by Weierstrass in 1860.

Functions to which the theorem does not apply

The following examples show why the function domain must be closed and bounded in order for the theorem to apply.  Each fails to attain a maximum on the given interval.

Generalization to metric and topological spaces

When moving from the real line  to metric spaces and general topological spaces, the appropriate generalization of a closed bounded interval is a compact set. A set  is said to be compact if it has the following property: from every collection of open sets  such that  , a finite subcollection can be chosen such that . This is usually stated in short as "every open cover of  has a finite subcover". The Heine–Borel theorem asserts that a subset of the real line is compact if and only if it is both closed and bounded.  Correspondingly, a metric space has the Heine–Borel property if every closed and bounded set is also   compact.

The concept of a continuous function can likewise be generalized.  Given topological spaces , a function  is said to be continuous if for every open set ,  is also open.  Given these definitions, continuous functions can be shown to preserve compactness:

Theorem.

In particular, if , then this theorem implies that  is closed and bounded for any compact set , which in turn implies that  attains its supremum and infimum on any (nonempty) compact set .  Thus, we have the following generalization of the extreme value theorem:

Theorem.

Slightly more generally, this is also true for an upper semicontinuous function. (see compact space#Functions and compact spaces).

Proving the theorems

By applying these results to the function , the existence of the lower bound and the result for the minimum of  follows. Also note that everything in the proof is done within the context of the real numbers.

We first prove the boundedness theorem, which is a step in the proof of the extreme value theorem. The basic steps involved in the proof of the extreme value theorem are:

 Prove the boundedness theorem.
 Show that there exists a subsequence that converges to a point in the domain.
 Use continuity to show that the image of the subsequence converges to the supremum.

Proof of the boundedness theorem
Statement     If  is continuous on  then it is bounded on 

Suppose the function   is not bounded above on the interval . Then, for every natural number , there exists an  such that . This defines a sequence . As  is closed, it contains .

Alternative proof
Statement     If  is continuous on  then it is bounded on 

From the non-zero length of  we can deduce that .

Suppose .

We must therefore have .
∎

Proof of the extreme value theorem

By the boundedness theorem, f is bounded from above, hence, by the  Dedekind-completeness of the real numbers, the least upper bound (supremum) M of f exists. It is necessary to find a point d in [a, b] such that M = f(d). Let n be a natural number. As M is the least upper bound, M – 1/n is not an upper bound for f. Therefore, there exists dn in [a, b] so that M – 1/n < f(dn). This defines a sequence {dn}. Since M is an upper bound for f, we have M – 1/n < f(dn) ≤ M for all n.  Therefore, the sequence {f(dn)} converges to M.

The Bolzano–Weierstrass theorem tells us that there exists a subsequence {}, which converges to some d and, as [a, b] is closed, d is in [a, b]. Since f is continuous at d, the sequence {f()} converges to f(d). But {f(dnk)} is a subsequence of {f(dn)} that converges to M, so M = f(d). Therefore, f attains its supremum M at d. ∎

Alternative proof of the extreme value theorem
The set  is a bounded set. Hence, its least upper bound exists by least upper bound property of the real numbers. Let  on .  If there is no point x on [a, b] so that f(x) = M ,then
 on [a, b].  Therefore,  is continuous on [a, b].

However, to every positive number ε, there is always some x in [a, b] such that  because M is the least upper bound. Hence, which means that  is not bounded.  Since every continuous function on a [a, b] is bounded, this contradicts the conclusion that  was continuous on [a, b].  Therefore, there must be a point x in [a, b] such that f(x) = M. ∎

Proof using the hyperreals
In the setting of non-standard calculus, let N  be an infinite hyperinteger.  The interval [0, 1] has a natural hyperreal extension.  Consider its partition into N subintervals of equal infinitesimal length 1/N, with partition points xi = i /N as i "runs" from 0 to N.  The function ƒ  is also naturally extended to a function ƒ* defined on the hyperreals between 0 and 1.  Note that in the standard setting (when N  is finite), a point with the maximal value of ƒ can always be chosen among the N+1 points xi, by induction.  Hence, by the transfer principle, there is a hyperinteger i0 such that 0 ≤ i0 ≤ N and   for all i = 0, ..., N.  Consider the real point

where st is the standard part function.  An arbitrary real point x lies in a suitable sub-interval of the partition, namely , so that  st(xi) = x.  Applying st to the inequality , we obtain .  By continuity of ƒ  we have
.
Hence ƒ(c) ≥ ƒ(x), for all real x, proving c to be a maximum of ƒ.

Proof from first principles

Statement       If  is continuous on  then it attains its supremum on 

If  then we are done.  Suppose therefore that  and let .   Consider the set  of points  in  such that .

We see from the above that . We will show that  is the point we are seeking i.e. the point where  attains its supremum, or in other words .

Suppose the contrary viz. .  Let  and consider the following two cases:

Hence  so that .

Extension to semi-continuous functions

If the continuity of the function f is weakened to semi-continuity, then the corresponding half of the boundedness theorem and the extreme value theorem hold and the values –∞ or +∞, respectively, from the extended real number line can be allowed as possible values. More precisely:

Theorem: If a function  is upper semi-continuous, meaning that

for all x in [a,b], then f is bounded above and attains its supremum.

Proof: If f(x) = –∞ for all x in [a,b], then the supremum is also –∞ and the theorem is true. In all other cases, the proof is a slight modification of the proofs given above. In the proof of the boundedness theorem, the  upper semi-continuity of f at x only implies that the limit superior of the subsequence {f(xnk)} is bounded above by f(x) < ∞, but that is enough to obtain the contradiction. In the proof of the extreme value theorem, upper semi-continuity of f at d implies that the limit superior of the subsequence {f(dnk)} is bounded above by f(d), but this suffices to conclude that f(d) = M. ∎

Applying this result to −f proves:

Theorem: If a function  is lower semi-continuous, meaning that

for all x in [a,b], then f is bounded below and attains its infimum.

A real-valued function is upper as well as lower semi-continuous, if and only if it is continuous in the usual sense. Hence these two theorems imply the boundedness theorem and the extreme value theorem.

References

Further reading

External links
 A Proof for extreme value theorem at cut-the-knot
 Extreme Value Theorem by  Jacqueline Wandzura with additional contributions by Stephen Wandzura, the Wolfram Demonstrations Project.
 
 Mizar system proof: http://mizar.org/version/current/html/weierstr.html#T15

Articles containing proofs
Theorems in calculus
Theorems in real analysis